Northern Exposure is an American Northern comedy-drama television series about the eccentric residents of a fictional small town in Alaska, that ran on CBS from July 12, 1990, to July 26, 1995, with a total of 110 episodes. It received a total of 57 award nominations during its five-year run and won 27, including the 1992 Primetime Emmy Award for Outstanding Drama Series, two additional Primetime Emmy Awards, four Creative Arts Emmy Awards, and two Golden Globes. Critic John Leonard called Northern Exposure "the best of the best television in the past 10 years".

Overview

Synopses

Season 1 (1990)

Season 2 (1991)

Season 3 (1991–92)

Season 4 (1992–93)

Season 5 (1993–94)

Season 6 (1994–95)

Ratings

Notes and references

Lists of American comedy-drama television series episodes

it:Un medico tra gli orsi#Episodi